Fana Broadcasting Corporate S.C. (FBC) is a state-owned mass media company operating in Ethiopia. Launched in 1994 it focuses mostly on political, social and economical reports about Ethiopia. It operates radio and television stations within Ethiopia.

Political stances
, FBC generally supported the federal government of Ethiopia and the ruling Prosperity Party.

Fana TV 
In 2014 it was announced that FBC would be building its own studio in the hopes of starting its own channel. In 2016, FBC formally signed an agreement with the Ethiopian Broadcasting Authority (EBA) to become a licensed broadcaster in the country.  Fana TV started test transmission of its satellite TV channel on Ethiosat in July 2017.

References

External links

Mass media companies established in 1994
Mass media in Ethiopia
Television in Ethiopia
1994 establishments in Ethiopia